Jae-sang may refer to:

 Park Jae-sang (born 1982) South Korean baseball player
 Park Jae-sang, known professionally as PSY (born 1977), Korean hip-hop artist
 JS Food Plan, founded by Jeong Jae-sang

See also 
 Jae (disambiguation)
 Sang (disambiguation)